Der ganz normale Wahnsinn  (English: "The Normal Madness") is a German television series.

See also
List of German television series

External links
 

1979 German television series debuts
1980 German television series endings
Television shows set in Munich
German-language television shows
Das Erste original programming